Damíán Rogelio Andermatten (born 21 September 1979) is an Argentine former footballer who is last known to have played as a midfielder for Club Sanjustino.

Career

In 2000, Andermatten trialed for Dutch top flight side Groningen. After that, he played for CLB Hà Nội in Vietnam.

In 2005, he signed for Argentine second division club Ben Hur, where he made 12 league appearances and scored 0 goals.

In 2008, Andermatten signed for 9 de Julio de Rafaela in the Argentine third division after playing for Indonesian team Persibom.

Before the 2010 season, he signed for Gimnasia de Concepción del Uruguay in the Argentine third division before returning to 9 de Julio de Rafaela.

References

External links
 
 
 Official Blog

Argentine footballers
Argentine people of Dutch descent
Association football midfielders
Living people
Expatriate footballers in Vietnam
Expatriate footballers in Indonesia
V.League 1 players
Argentine expatriate sportspeople in Vietnam
Argentine expatriate sportspeople in Indonesia
1979 births
People from Rafaela
Club Sportivo Ben Hur players
9 de Julio de Rafaela players
Gimnasia y Esgrima de Concepción del Uruguay footballers
Hà Nội FC (1956) players
Argentine expatriate footballers
Sportspeople from Santa Fe Province